Life, Liberty & the Pursuit of Free Downloads is a studio album by American punk rock band T.S.O.L., released in 2009 to coincide with the band's thirtieth anniversary. The album was released for free as a download through Hurley; Hurley's website hosted video of the band recording the album. The band asked that fans instead consider donating to charity the money that they would have spent on purchasing the album.

Production
Hurley funded the production of the album. It built a studio in one of its warehouses, where the band recorded in December 2008.

Critical reception
AllMusic wrote that "the key weapon [is] busy keyboardist Greg Kuehn, [who] floors yet again, working off Ron Emory's spider web of neo-psych guitars, while extroverted Jack Grisham remains uniquely charismatic, even when not dominating a stage."

Track listing
"Come Into My Nightmare" – 3:26
"She's Got a Bomb" – 2:17
"Modern Girl" – 3:00
"The Pain That We Go Through" – 3:07
"We're Together" – 2:45
"Go to Bed Sleepy" – 3:19
"Love That Mess" – 2:24
"Wait For Me" – 3:00
"What Stephanie Wants" – 3:19
"Someone Like You" – 3:02

Personnel
Ron Emory – guitars
Mike Roche – bass
Greg Kuehn – keys
Jack Grisham – vocals
Anthony "Tiny" Biuso (Tiny Bubs) – drums

References

2009 albums
Albums free for download by copyright owner
T.S.O.L. albums
Sponsored albums